This was the first edition of the tournament.

Orlando Luz and Rafael Matos won the title after defeating Sergio Galdós and Diego Hidalgo 7–5, 6–4 in the final.

Seeds

Draw

References

External links
 Main draw

Challenger Concepción - Doubles